Sambasiva Rao Kosaraju is a professor of computer science at Johns Hopkins University, and division director for Computing & Communication Foundations at the National Science Foundation. He has done extensive work in the design and analysis of parallel and sequential algorithms.

In 1978, he wrote a paper describing a method to efficiently compute strongly connected members of a directed graph, a method later called Kosaraju's algorithm. Along with Paul Callahan, he published many articles on efficient algorithms for computing the well-separated pair decomposition of a point set. His research efforts include efficient algorithms for pattern matching, data structure simulations, universal graphs, DNA sequence assembly, derandomization and investigations of immune system responses.

In 1995, he was inducted as a Fellow of the Association for Computing Machinery. He is also a fellow of the IEEE. A common saying at Johns Hopkins University, "At some point, the learning stops and the pain begins." has been attributed to him. There used to be a shrine in the CS Undergraduate Lab in his honour.

He was born in India, and he did his bachelor's degree in engineering from Andhra University, Masters from IIT Kharagpur, and holds a PhD from University of Pennsylvania.

References

External links 
.

Johns Hopkins University faculty
American computer scientists
Theoretical computer scientists
Fellows of the Association for Computing Machinery
Indian emigrants to the United States
University of Pennsylvania alumni
Living people
Year of birth missing (living people)
Fellow Members of the IEEE
Andhra University alumni
IIT Kharagpur alumni